Neptis melicerta, the original club-dot sailer or streaked sailer, is a butterfly in the family Nymphalidae. It is found in Guinea-Bissau, Guinea, Sierra Leone, Liberia, Ivory Coast, Ghana, Nigeria, Cameroon, Gabon, the Republic of the Congo, Angola, the Democratic Republic of the Congo and western Uganda. The habitat consists of forests.

The larvae feed on Acacia ataxacantha, Dalbergia hostilis, Abrus canescens, Abrus pulabellus and Allophylus species

References

Butterflies described in 1773
melicerta
Butterflies of Africa
Taxa named by Dru Drury